Thomas Michael Foglietta (December 3, 1928 – November 13, 2004) was an American politician and diplomat. He represented Pennsylvania in the House of Representatives from 1981 to 1997, and later served as United States Ambassador to Italy from December 1997 to October 2001.

Biography and early career
Foglietta was born on December 3, 1928 in a house on 7th and Clymer Streets in South Philadelphia, and graduated from South Catholic High School in the city. Foglietta's father, Michael, was a Republican committeeman, ward leader and clerk of quarter sessions who was ultimately elected to the Philadelphia City Council in 1947. He received his bachelor's degree from Saint Joseph's University in Philadelphia in 1949, and his Juris Doctor from the Temple University law school in 1952. After graduating from law school, he entered private practice.

In 1955, Foglietta ran for Philadelphia City Council. Foglietta won, becoming the youngest person ever elected to that body. Foglietta served on the Council for 20 years. In 1975, he ran for mayor of Philadelphia, coming in third place to Frank Rizzo. Following his defeat, Foglietta became a regional director for the U.S. Department of Labor.

Congressional career
In the 1980 elections, Foglietta won in Pennsylvania's 1st Congressional District, running as an independent. Foglietta defeated Congressman Michael "Ozzie" Myers who had been convicted in the Abscam bribery scandal. Following his election, Foglietta switched parties and became a Democrat, stating "I belonged to the progressive faction of the Republican Party — a faction that is no longer in existence." In Congress, Foglietta concentrated his energies on foreign affairs and the preservation of the Philadelphia Navy Yard, which was slated for closure by the Base Realignment and Closure Commission. In 1985 a melee broke out at Seoul Airport when Foglietta accompanied South Korean dissident Kim Dae Jung back home. The two formed a lifelong friendship and in 1999, Foglietta received a South Korean human rights award for supporting democracy there, while Kim received Philadelphia's Liberty Medal. Foglietta later served on the House Appropriations Committee where he worked to secure federal funding for the restoration of various Philadelphia historic Sites including Independence Hall and Washington Square. Foglietta was also well known for founding the Congressional Urban Caucus, a legislative service organization dedicated to promoting urban policy issues in the House.

On election day in 1984, Foglietta successfully ran down a purse-snatcher after witnessing two boys rob an 84-year-old woman.

As Ambassador to Italy
Foglietta served in the House until 1997, when he resigned and was appointed ambassador to Italy by President Bill Clinton. Upon his nomination, the Philadelphia Daily News published an editorial that stated: "In 68 years, Thomas Michael Foglietta will have made it from a rowhouse at 7th and Clymer to the embassy in Rome on a smile and a trustworthy handshake. Which, as it turns out, is an excellent way to travel." The 1998 Cavalese cable car disaster happened during his tenure in Rome; in the accident, a U.S. military aircraft flew too low, severing a gondola cable, resulting in the deaths of 20 skiers. Foglietta visited the accident site and knelt in prayer, offering apologies on behalf of the United States. An editorial in La Repubblica, an Italian newspaper remarked: "Yesterday it was up to Ambassador Thomas Foglietta to do something we Italians do less and less. Foglietta expressed his apologies on behalf of President Clinton and the American people for that terrible tragedy and kneeled down in prayer for the poor victims."

Foglietta died in 2004 following complications from surgery.

See also

 History of the Italian Americans in Philadelphia

References

External links

 official congressional website (archived)

The Political Graveyard

1928 births
2004 deaths
Ambassadors of the United States to Italy
Pennsylvania lawyers
Temple University Beasley School of Law alumni
Saint Joseph's University alumni
Philadelphia City Council members
Pennsylvania Republicans
Democratic Party members of the United States House of Representatives from Pennsylvania
Pennsylvania Independents
Independent members of the United States House of Representatives
20th-century American politicians
20th-century American lawyers
20th-century American diplomats
21st-century American diplomats
American people of Italian descent